Ray Morgan is an American curler, a  and a 1972 United States men's curling champion.

That 1972 silver medallist team is best known for the "Curse of LaBonte" - one of the most famous curses in curling history. It was caused by an incident at the finals of the 1972 world men's curling championship, the 1972 Air Canada Silver Broom in Garmisch-Partenkirchen, Germany.

He also won the United States Mixed Curling Championship.

Personal life
Morgan attended the University of North Dakota.

Teams

Men's

Mixed

References

External links
 

American male curlers
American curling champions
University of North Dakota alumni
Living people
Year of birth missing (living people)